Araarso is a town of Somali Region in Ethiopia.

It is about 70 kilometers southeast of Jijiga.

References 

Districts of Somali Region